Andre Agassi was the defending champion, but lost in the quarterfinals this year.

Tommy Haas won the tournament, beating Dmitry Tursunov in the final, 4–6, 7–5, 6–3.

Seeds

Draw

Finals

Top half

Bottom half

External links
 Main draw
 Qualifying draw

Los Angeles Open (tennis)
2006 ATP Tour